Loricariichthys labialis is a species of catfish in the family Loricariidae. It is a freshwater fish native to South America, where it occurs in the basins of the Paraguay River and the middle Paraná River in Argentina, Brazil, Paraguay, and Uruguay. It is also known to occur in ponds. The species reaches  in standard length and is believed to be a facultative air-breather.

References 

Loricariini
Fish described in 1895
Taxobox binomials not recognized by IUCN